John W. Ayers is an adjunct associate professor and epidemiologist at the San Diego State University. He researches in the field of public health informatics and the use of social media data in detecting behavioral health trends. His public health research expertise is in studying the circulation of information online. Trained in both political science and data science, he has published in medical journals including Journal of the American Medical Association, JAMA Internal Medicine, American Journal of Public Health, and American Journal of Preventive Medicine. His research findings have been featured in national and international media sources, including The New York Times, The Washington Post, Los Angeles Times, Time, and Newsweek.

Education
California State University, Bakersfield, B.A., 06/06, Political Science
San Diego State University, M.A., 06/08, Political Science
Johns Hopkins Bloomberg School of Public Health, Ph.D., 06/11, Behavioral Sciences
Harvard-MIT Health Sciences & Technology, Fellow, 12/12 Informatics

Selected publications 
 Ayers, J. W. (2011). Tracking the rise in popularity of electronic nicotine delivery systems (electronic cigarettes) using search query surveillance. American Journal of Public Health.
 Ayers, J. W. (2013). Seasonality in seeking mental health information on Google. American Journal of Preventive Medicine.
 Ayers, J. W. (2014). Could behavioral medicine lead the web data revolution? Journal of the American Medical Association.

References 

Year of birth missing (living people)
Living people
American epidemiologists
Johns Hopkins Bloomberg School of Public Health alumni
San Diego State University alumni
San Diego State University faculty
California State University, Bakersfield alumni